Estolides may refer to:

 a class of fatty acid esters
 Desmiphorini, also known as Estolides, a tribe of beetles

See also 
 Estoloides, a genus of beetles